Mignon Nixon is an American academic. She serves as the Professor of Modern and Contemporary Art History at University College London in London, United Kingdom.

Early life
Mignon Elizabeth Nixon is the daughter of John Trice Nixon, a United States federal judge, and Betty C. Nixon, a former city councillor in Nashville, Tennessee. Her paternal grandfather, Herman Clarence Nixon, was a political scientist at Vanderbilt University and a member of the Southern Agrarians.

Nixon graduated from Harvard University and received a PhD from the City University of New York.

Career
Nixon is a professor at University College London. She specialises in sexuality and aggression in art since 1945, with particular reference to feminism and gender politics.

Nixon was a fellow at the Sterling and Francine Clark Art Institute, and a Terra Foundation for American Art Senior Scholar in 2007. She is a co-editor of October magazine.

Personal life
Nixon married Gregory D. Smith, a direct descendant of Stephen A. Douglas, in 1995.

Selected publications
“Losing Louise,” October 134 (Fall 2010), pp. 122–132.
“The Undiscovered Country” (on Nira Pereg’s Kept Alive), Artforum (October 2010).
"Roni Horn,” Artforum, vol. 48, no. 1 (September 2009), pp. 282–283.
“Blood Lust,” Photoworks Issue 11. (Autumn-Winter 2008), pp. 40–41. Brighton: Photoworks, 2008.
“Book of Tongues,” in Nancy Spero: Dissidances. Barcelona and Madrid: Museu d’Art Contemporáni and Museu National Centro de Art Reina Sofia, 2008, pp. 21–53.
“Feminist Time: A Conversation,” Grey Room 31 (Spring 2008), pp. 33–67.
“Spero’s Curses,” October 122 (Fall 2007), pp. 3–30. 
“War Inside/War Outside: Feminist Critiques and the Politics of Psychoanalysis,” Texte zur Kunst, vol. 17, no. 68 (December 2007), pp. 65–75, pp. 134–138.
“o + x,” October 119 (Winter 2007), pp. 6–20.

References

External links
Mignon Nixon discussing Art, Theory, and the Critique of Ideology on YouTube.

Living people
Year of birth missing (living people)
Graduate Center, CUNY alumni
Harvard University alumni
Academics of the Courtauld Institute of Art
American art historians
Women art historians